Julião de Miranda Henriques Neto (born 16 August 1981) is an amateur Brazilian flyweight boxer who won a silver medal at the 2010 South American Games. He competed at the 2012 Summer Olympics and qualified for the 2016 Summer Olympics.

References

1981 births
Living people
Sportspeople from Rio de Janeiro (city)
Brazilian male boxers
Flyweight boxers
Olympic boxers of Brazil
Boxers at the 2012 Summer Olympics
Boxers at the 2016 Summer Olympics
Pan American Games medalists in boxing
Pan American Games bronze medalists for Brazil
Boxers at the 2015 Pan American Games
South American Games silver medalists for Brazil
South American Games medalists in boxing
Competitors at the 2010 South American Games
Medalists at the 2011 Pan American Games
20th-century Brazilian people
21st-century Brazilian people